Matthew Hellickson (born March 21, 1998) is an American professional ice hockey defenceman currently playing for the  Toronto Marlies of the American Hockey League (AHL). He was drafted 214th overall in the 2017 NHL Entry Draft by the New Jersey Devils.

Hellickson represented the United States at the 2021 IIHF World Championship.

Career statistics

Regular season and playoffs

International

Awards and honors

References

External links

1998 births
Living people
American ice hockey defensemen
Binghamton Devils players
Ice hockey players from Minnesota
Newfoundland Growlers players
New Jersey Devils draft picks
Notre Dame Fighting Irish men's ice hockey players
Sioux City Musketeers players
People from Rogers, Minnesota
Toronto Marlies players
USA Hockey National Team Development Program players